Business credit reports are usually created by credit bureaus when credit grantors report information related to a business credit account. These reports are sometimes examined during the decision-making process of whether or not to grant credit to a business.

There are many credit management companies that specialize in business credit reports. These reports are generated by various credit bureaus such as D&B, Experian, Equifax. Credit teams review and analyze the business credit reports before extending credit to customers. These credit management companies are in the business of gathering the most predictive information on individuals and companies beforehand in order to assure that a company that has an interest in providing credit to another company or individual will have less worries on whether or not they will get paid and will not have to concern themselves with the risk associated with not knowing the borrowers history. Other uses of this report is to assess risk in extending loans to businesses, insuring businesses, underwriting insurance risk, purchasing businesses, investing in businesses or even company directors.

Credit management companies that specialize in offering business credit reports typically provide the most up to date information about business credit that's available today, saving time, money and ensuring a completely sound and informed credit decision. This is in addition to companies who also provide consumer reports.

Some notable business credit bureaus are Equifax, Dun & Bradstreet, and Experian. While the credit bureaus provide reports and information to companies. Organizations like Corporate Credit Score specialize in providing information and tools to business owners. So they can track their own business credit history and dispute the bureau reports if a mistake has been made.

The first step for a business owner who wants to establish a business credit report is to get an EIN from the IRS. Then you can begin applying for business credit accounts with vendors. If the vendors report the credit information to the credit bureaus, tradelines will be created on your business credit report. For new businesses, this can take some time.
If credit grantors use a PAYDEX Score in determining whether or not to grant credit to a business, they will usually want to see a score of 75 or better.

External links
Experian Business Credit Report.
Equifax Business Credit Report.
CRIF High Mark Business Credit Report

Credit management